HD 2942 is a triple star system in the constellation Andromeda located approximately  away.

The primary component, a red giant of spectral type K0III, has an apparent magnitude of 6.33, meaning that it is barely visible with the naked eye under good conditions.

The secondary component is much fainter, with an apparent magnitude 11.26, and is located 8.6 arcseconds away. It is a double-lined spectroscopic binary, where two very similar G-type main sequence stars of spectral types G6V and G8V orbit around their common center of mass in 7.489 days. The pair complete an orbit around the primary star every 24,762 years.

Catalogues of stellar multiplicity, like the Washington Double Star Catalog, usually list another component; this star, however, is located much more far away than the other two.

References

External links
 Image ADS 455

Andromeda (constellation)
002942
Triple star systems
K-type giants
0134
002583
Durchmusterung objects